The Brazen Serpent is a painting by Peter Paul Rubens, probably dating to between 1635 and 1640. It is now in the National Gallery in London. Its shows a scene from the Old Testament (Numbers 21: 6–9).

It seems to include some work by his students, who may have blocked it in from a modello by Rubens himself, with the artist working up the result.

External links
http://www.nationalgallery.org.uk/paintings/peter-paul-rubens-the-brazen-serpent

1640 paintings
Paintings by Peter Paul Rubens in the National Gallery, London
Snakes in art
Paintings of children
Paintings depicting Moses